The Federal Mine Safety and Health Review Commission is an independent adjudicative agency of the United States government that provides administrative trial and appellate review of legal disputes arising under the Federal Mine Safety and Health Amendments Act, or Mine Act, of 1977.

Under the Mine Act, the U.S. Department of Labor issues regulations covering health and safety in the nation's mines. Federal mine inspectors employed by the Department's Mine Safety and Health Administration (MSHA) enforce these regulations by issuing citations and orders to mine operators. The Commission is concerned solely with the adjudication of disputes under the Mine Act, including the determination of appropriate penalties. It does not regulate mining or enforce the Mine Act. The Commission was established as an independent agency to ensure its impartiality.

Most cases deal with civil penalties assessed against mine operators and address whether the alleged safety and health violations occurred as well as the appropriateness of proposed penalties. Other types of cases include orders to close a mine, miners' charges of safety related discrimination and miners’ requests for compensation after the mine is idled by a closure order.

The Commission's administrative law judges (ALJs) decide cases at the trial level. The five-member Commission provides appellate review. Commissioners are appointed by the President and confirmed by the Senate. Review of an ALJ decision by the Commission is not guaranteed but requires the affirmative vote of two Commissioners. Most of the cases accepted for review are generated from petitions filed by parties adversely affected by an ALJ decision. However, cases can also be accepted based on the Commission's own direction for review. An ALJ decision that is not accepted for review becomes a final, non-precedential order of the Commission. Appeals from the Commission's decisions are to the U.S. courts of appeals.

Procedures for appealing cases to the Commission are contained in its Rules of Procedure published in 29 CFR Part 2700. The Commission also publishes these rules in a separate pamphlet. A brochure, entitled "How a Case Proceeds Before the Commission" is also available. The Commission's headquarters and Office of Administrative Law Judges are co-located in Washington, D.C., with an additional OALJ's offices in Denver, Colorado and Pittsburgh, Pennsylvania. Currently, the Commission has a budget of more than US$18 million and a staff of 76 employees.

See also
 Title 29 of the Code of Federal Regulations

References

External links
 Federal Mine Safety and Health Review Commission
 Records of the Federal Mine Safety and Health Review Commission in the National Archives (Record Group 470)

Independent agencies of the United States government
Mining law and governance
Government agencies established in 1977
Mine safety